Ela San To Tzivaeri,' Έλα σαν το τζιβαέρι (el)  is a Greek folkloric song (Tsifteteli). Its music was composed Greek Vasilis Kazoulis. Greek lyrics written by Vasilis Kazoulis.

There are similar song known as Κράτα Για Το Τέλος (Krata gia to telos) (Hebrew:Bakafe Shel Stelios) Its music was composed Greek Pantelis Thalassinos. Greek lyrics written by Elias Katsulis. Hebrew Lyrics written by Zion Kedem.

There are similar song known as Добре Дошъл (Dobre Doshul). Its music was composed Bulgarian Gloria. Bulgarian lyrics written by Gloria.

See also
Tsifteteli
Gloria (Bulgarian singer)

References

Turkish songs
Greek songs
Bulgarian songs
Jewish songs
Glykeria songs
Year of song unknown
Songwriter unknown